Hill Grange High School was a private school for boys and girls located on Pedder Road, Mumbai, Maharashtra, India.

History
It was founded in 1939 by Madame Sophy Kelly, a prominent member of the Indian Jewish community. She was a well known personality and was referred to as the queen of Peddar Road. She contributed towards the educational ministry of Maharashtra, and was the school's principal for most of its history. The school closed in 2003.

Early timeline
1939 — Founding and establishment of the Hill Grange Nursery and Kindergarten School
1942 — The establishment of the Hill Grange primary section.
1943 — The establishment of the lower secondary of the school.
1956 — Final and complete establishment of the two sections of the Hill Grange High School
Senior Cambridge
Secondary School Certificate

Notable alumni 
 Business:
 Mukesh Ambani — Billionaire, Chairman and Managing Director of the Indian conglomerate Reliance Industries
 Anand Jain — Billionaire, Chairman of Jai Corp Limited
 Anil Ambani — Billionaire, Chairman and Managing Director of Reliance Anil Dhirubhai Ambani Group
 Entertainment:
 Rajesh Khanna — Actor, producer
 Prem Krishen — Actor, producer
 Shailender Singh — Singer, actor
 Neetu Singh — Actress
 Varsha Bhosle — Singer, journalist
 Vishal Dadlani — Indian Music Director, Singer
 Nazneen — Actress
 Himesh Reshammiya — Indian Music Director, Singer, Actor, Television Producer, Lyricist, Film Producer, Script Writer, and Distributor
 Literature:
Ashok K. Banker - Author, Screenwriter, Celebrity.
 Others:
 Sanjiv Bhatt — Indian Police Service

References

Principal Sophie Kelly "The Jewish Communities of India: Identity in a Colonial Era"

External links

Private schools in Mumbai
High schools and secondary schools in Mumbai
Boys' schools in India
Educational institutions established in 1943
1943 establishments in India